The Tablas slender skink (Brachymeles dalawangdaliri) is a species of skink endemic to the Philippines.

References

Reptiles of the Philippines
Reptiles described in 2016
Brachymeles